Alton Court (Bud) Michaels (April 1, 1900 – October 21, 1972) was an American football running back.

After attending Ohio State University, he joined the Akron Pros of the National Football League, and played a total of 14 games for the team in the 1923 and 1924 seasons, earning first-team All-Pro honors in 1923. In 1925, he played for the Cleveland Bulldogs, appearing in all 14 of the team's contests. The following year, Michaels joined the Cleveland Panthers of the new American Football League and appeared in all five games the team played before folding.

References

1900 births
1972 deaths
American football running backs
Heidelberg Student Princes football players
Ohio State Buckeyes football players
Akron Pros players
Cleveland Bulldogs players
Cleveland Panthers players
People from Tiffin, Ohio